Pengshui Miao and Tujia Autonomous County is an autonomous county for the Miao and Tujia people located in southeastern Chongqing, China, bordering Guizhou province to the south and southwest and Hubei province to the northeast.

History 
During the Shang and Zhou dynasties, the region of contemporary Pengshui belonged to the State of Ba. During the Warring States period, the area belonged to the Qianzhong Commandery, which would later be incorporated into Qin dynasty China.

During the Han dynasty, the area would be reorganized as Fuling County.

Under the Sui dynasty, in 593 CE, the area was organized as Pengshui County. Pengshui means "Peng River", which was the old name for the Yu River. By 1645 during the Qing dynasty, it was part of Chongqing Prefecture. In 1913 (Republic of China), it was part of Dongchuan Circuit. In 1927, it was reassigned to the Changgong Bureau of Sichuan Province. And in 1935, of the Eighth Administrative Inspection Area of Sichuan.

People's Republic of China 
On November 16, 1949, Pengshui was captured by the communists. In September 1952, Fuling Special District was transferred to Sichuan, and was changed to a prefecture in June 1968.

On November 14, 1983 Pengshui was approved as an autonomous county. The official status began November 10 of the following year. In June 1997, it fell under the administration of Chongqing, which it remains today.

Geography 

Pengshui Miao and Tujia Autonomous County is located in the Sichuan Basin along the Wu River, in the mountainous region of Wuling. A total of 54.2% of Pengshui is covered by forest. Geographic coordinates: 28°57′29° 51′ North, 107°48′108°36′ East. Altitude of the seat: .

Neighbours: 
 North: Shizhu Tujia Autonomous County
 Northeast: Lichuan City, Enshi Tujia and Miao Autonomous Prefecture, Hubei
 East: Qianjiang District
 Southeast: Youyang Tujia and Miao Autonomous County
 South: Yanhe Tujia Autonomous County, Guizhou; Wuchuan Gelao and Miao Autonomous County
 Southwest: Daozhen Gelao and Miao Autonomous County, Guizhou
 West: Wulong County
 Northwest: Fengdu County

Climate 

Demographics 

As of the 2010 Chinese Census, the county had a population 545,094, down from the 590,228 reported in the 2000 Chinese Census. In 1996, the county had an estimated population of 587,000.

59.5% of Pengshui residents are members of the following 11 ethnic minorities: Miao, Tujia, Mongols, Hui, Gelao, Dong, Tibetans, Manchus, Zhuang, Yi, and Hani. There are 270,000 Miao and 90,000 Tujia in Pengshui.

Subdivisions 
As of 2020, the county administers 3 subdistricts, 18 towns, and 18 townships.

Subdistricts 
The county administers the following 3 subdistricts:

Towns 
The county administers the following 18 towns:

Townships 
The county administers the following 18 townships:

Economy 
Mineral deposits in the county include coal, barite, marble, fluorite, and calcite.

Transportation 
The Chongqing–Huaihua railway runs through the county. Major expressways which pass through the county include the G65 Baotou–Maoming Expressway and National Highway 319.

References

External links
 Official site (2020)
Official site (2003)
 Sacrificed to the river god China Daily report on the flooding of Gongtan village for a nearby hydroplant

Miao autonomous counties
County-level divisions of Chongqing
Tujia autonomous counties